Mark Semioli (born March 20, 1968 in Brooklyn, New York) is a retired American soccer defender who played six seasons in Major Soccer League, four in American Professional Soccer League and three in USISL.  He won the 1994 U.S. Open Cup with the San Francisco Greek-Americans.

College
Semioli attended Stanford University, playing on the men’s soccer team from 1986 to 1989.  He was a 1987 Third Team All American.

Professional
In 1989, Semioli played as an amateur with the professional San Francisco Bay Blackhawks of the Western Soccer League during the collegiate off season.  Following the completion of his collegiate eligibility in the fall of 1989, Semioli signed a professional contract with the Blackhawks.  In 1990, the WSL merged with the American Soccer League to form the American Professional Soccer League (APSL).  The Blackhawks won the 1991 APSL championship.  Despite its success, the team lost money and in 1993 moved to the lower division USISL.  Semioli moved to the Palo Alto Firebirds of USISL that year.  The Firebirds were sold and moved to San Jose, California, becoming the Silicon Valley Firebirds for the 1994 USISL season.  Semioli was the team captain and a first team All Star.  He also spent part of the season with the San Francisco Greek-Americans, winning the U.S. Open Cup with them.

In 1995, Semioli left the Firebirds and moved to the Monterey Bay Jaguars.  In addition to playing for the Jaguars, Semioli also coached the Jaguars for part of the season.  He was the USISL Western Division Defender of the Year as the Jaguars went won the Western Division Conference. In February 1996, the Los Angeles Galaxy picked Semioli in the fifth round (44th overall) in the Inaugural MLS Draft. He played twenty-eight games that season, then began the 1997 season in Los Angeles before being traded to the MetroStars on June 17, 1997 in exchange for a second round pick in the 1998 MLS Supplemental Draft.  The Galaxy made this move to make room to sign Paul Caligiuri.  Semioli remained with the MetroStars until November 17, 2001, when the team waived him.  He subsequently retired from playing professionally.  Semioli continues to play, and coach, in the Cosmopolitan Soccer League with the New York Athletic Club.

Since his retirement, Semioli has been working as a middle school World Cultures/Religions and History teacher for 6th and 7th graders at Kent Place School in New Jersey and for high school students in Scarsdale, NY. He is the department chair of history in Kent Place School. He is also one of the lead teachers for the social committee at Kent Place.He was inducted into the Suffolk Sports Hall of Fame on Long Island in the Soccer Category with the Class of 2017.

References

External links
 Stanford soccer media guide
 MetroStars profile

1968 births
Living people
American Professional Soccer League players
American soccer coaches
American soccer players
LA Galaxy players
Major League Soccer players
New York Red Bulls players
California Jaguars players
Palo Alto Firebirds players
San Francisco Bay Blackhawks players
San Francisco Greek-American A.C. players
Silicon Valley Firebirds players
Stanford Cardinal men's soccer players
USISL coaches
USISL players
Western Soccer Alliance players
Association football defenders